The 59th United States Congress was a meeting of the legislative branch of the United States federal government, composed of the United States Senate and the United States House of Representatives. It met in Washington, D.C. from March 4, 1905, to March 4, 1907, during the fifth and sixth years of Theodore Roosevelt's presidency. The apportionment of seats in the House of Representatives was based on the 1900 United States census. Both chambers had a Republican majority.

Major events

March 4, 1905: President Theodore Roosevelt began his second (only full) term.

Major legislation

 May 28, 1906: Foreign Dredge Act of 1906
 June 8, 1906: Antiquities Act
 June 29, 1906: Hepburn Act
 June 30, 1906: Pure Food and Drug Act of 1906 (Wiley Act), ch. 3915, 
 June 30, 1906: Meat Inspection Act (Beveridge Act)
 1906: The Carnegie Foundation for the Advancement of Teaching chartered.
 March 2, 1907: Expatriation Act of 1907,

Party summary

Senate

House of Representatives

Leaders

Senate leadership

Presiding
President: Charles W. Fairbanks (R)
President pro tempore: William P. Frye (R)
Republican Conference Chairman: William B. Allison
 Democratic Caucus Chair: Arthur Pue Gorman, until June 4, 1906
 Joseph Clay Stiles Blackburn, afterwards
 Democratic Caucus Secretary: Edward W. Carmack

House leadership

Presiding
Speaker: Joseph G. Cannon (R)

Majority (Republican) leadership
Majority Leader: Sereno E. Payne
Majority Whip: James E. Watson
 Republican Conference Chair: William Peters Hepburn

Minority (Democratic) leadership
Minority Leader: John Sharp Williams
Minority Whip: James T. Lloyd
 Democratic Caucus Chairman: Robert Lee Henry
 Democratic Campaign Committee Chairman: James M. Griggs

Members
This list is arranged by chamber, then by state. Senators are listed by class, and representatives are listed by district.
Skip to House of Representatives, below

Senate
At this time, Senators were elected by the state legislatures every two years, with one-third beginning new six-year terms with each Congress. Preceding the names in the list below are Senate class numbers, which indicate the cycle of their election, In this Congress, Class 2 meant their term ended with this Congress, requiring reelection in 1906; Class 3 meant their term began in the last Congress, requiring reelection in 1908; and Class 1 meant their term began in this Congress, requiring reelection in 1910.

Alabama 
 2. John T. Morgan (D)
 3. Edmund W. Pettus (D)

Arkansas 
 2. James H. Berry (D)
 3. James P. Clarke (D)

California 
 1. Frank P. Flint (R)
 3. George C. Perkins (R)

Colorado 
 2. Thomas M. Patterson (D)
 3. Henry M. Teller (D)

Connecticut 
 1. Morgan G. Bulkeley (R)
 3. Orville H. Platt (R), until April 21, 1905
 Frank B. Brandegee (R), from May 10, 1905

Delaware 
 1. Henry A. du Pont, (R), from June 13, 1906
 2. J. Frank Allee (R)

Florida 
 2. James P. Taliaferro (D)
 3. Stephen Mallory (D)

Georgia 
 2. Augustus O. Bacon (D)
 3. Alexander S. Clay (D)

Idaho 
 2. Fred Dubois (D)
 3. Weldon B. Heyburn (R)

Illinois 
 2. Shelby M. Cullom (R)
 3. Albert J. Hopkins (R)

Indiana 
 1. Albert J. Beveridge (R)
 3. James A. Hemenway (R)

Iowa 
 2. Jonathan P. Dolliver (R)
 3. William B. Allison (R)

Kansas 
 2. Joseph R. Burton (R), until June 4, 1906
 Alfred W. Benson (R), June 11, 1906 - January 23, 1907
 Charles Curtis (R), from January 29, 1907
 3. Chester I. Long (R)

Kentucky 
 2. Joseph C. S. Blackburn (D)
 3. James B. McCreary (D)

Louisiana 
 2. Murphy J. Foster (D)
 3. Samuel D. McEnery (D)

Maine 
 1. Eugene Hale (R)
 2. William P. Frye (R)

Maryland 
 1. Isidor Rayner (D)
 3. Arthur P. Gorman (D), until June 4, 1906
 William P. Whyte (D), from June 8, 1906

Massachusetts 
 1. Henry Cabot Lodge (R)
 2. Winthrop M. Crane (R)

Michigan 
 1. Julius C. Burrows (R)
 2. Russell A. Alger (R), until January 24, 1907
 William A. Smith (R), from February 6, 1907

Minnesota 
 1. Moses E. Clapp (R)
 2. Knute Nelson (R)

Mississippi 
 1. Hernando D. Money (D)
 2. Anselm J. McLaurin (D)

Missouri 
 1. William Warner (R), from March 18, 1905
 3. William J. Stone (D)
|

Montana 
 1. Thomas H. Carter (R)
 2. William A. Clark (D)

Nebraska 
 1. Elmer J. Burkett (R)
 2. Joseph H. Millard (R)

Nevada 
 1. George S. Nixon (R)
 3. Francis G. Newlands (D)

New Hampshire 
 2. Henry E. Burnham (R)
 3. Jacob H. Gallinger (R)

New Jersey 
 1. John Kean (R)
 2. John F. Dryden (R)

New York 
 1. Chauncey M. Depew (R)
 3. Thomas C. Platt (R)

North Carolina 
 2. Furnifold M. Simmons (D)
 3. Lee S. Overman (D)

North Dakota 
 1. Porter J. McCumber (R)
 3. Henry C. Hansbrough (R)

Ohio 
 1. Charles W. F. Dick (R)
 3. Joseph B. Foraker (R)

Oregon 
 2. John H. Mitchell (R), until December 8, 1905
 John M. Gearin (D), December 13, 1905 - January 23, 1907
 Frederick W. Mulkey (R), from January 23, 1907
 3. Charles W. Fulton (R)

Pennsylvania 
 1. Philander C. Knox (R)
 3. Boies Penrose (R)

Rhode Island 
 1. Nelson W. Aldrich (R)
 2. George P. Wetmore (R)

South Carolina 
 2. Benjamin R. Tillman (D)
 3. Asbury C. Latimer (D)

South Dakota 
 2. Robert J. Gamble (R)
 3. Alfred B. Kittredge (R)

Tennessee 
 1. William B. Bate (D), until March 9, 1905
James B. Frazier (D), from March 21, 1905
 2. Edward W. Carmack (D)

Texas 
 1. Charles A. Culberson (D)
 2. Joseph W. Bailey (D)

Utah 
 1. George Sutherland (R)
 3. Reed Smoot (R)

Vermont 
 1. Redfield Proctor (R)
 3. William P. Dillingham (R)

Virginia 
 1. John W. Daniel (D)
 2. Thomas S. Martin (D)

Washington 
 1. Samuel H. Piles (R)
 3. Levi Ankeny (R)

West Virginia 
 1. Nathan B. Scott (R)
 2. Stephen B. Elkins (R)

Wisconsin 
 1. Robert M. La Follette Sr. (R)
 3. John C. Spooner (R)

Wyoming 
 1. Clarence D. Clark (R)
 2. Francis E. Warren (R)

House of Representatives

Alabama 
 . George W. Taylor (D)
 . Ariosto A. Wiley (D)
 . Henry D. Clayton (D)
 . Sydney J. Bowie (D)
 . J. Thomas Heflin (D)
 . John H. Bankhead (D)
 . John L. Burnett (D)
 . William N. Richardson (D)
 . Oscar Underwood (D)

Arkansas 
 . Robert B. Macon (D)
 . Stephen Brundidge Jr. (D)
 . John C. Floyd (D)
 . John S. Little (D), until January 14, 1907
 . Charles C. Reid (D)
 . Joseph Taylor Robinson (D)
 . Robert M. Wallace (D)

California 
 . James N. Gillett (R), until November 4, 1906
 William F. Englebright (R), from November 6, 1906
 . Duncan E. McKinlay (R)
 . Joseph R. Knowland (R)
 . Julius Kahn (R)
 . Everis A. Hayes (R)
 . James C. Needham (R)
 . James McLachlan (R)
 . Sylvester C. Smith (R)

Colorado 
 . Robert W. Bonynge (R)
 . Herschel M. Hogg (R)
 . Franklin E. Brooks (R)

Connecticut 
 . E. Stevens Henry (R)
 . Nehemiah D. Sperry (R)
 . Frank B. Brandegee (R), until May 10, 1905
 Edwin W. Higgins (R), from October 2, 1905
 . Ebenezer J. Hill (R)
 . George L. Lilley (R)

Delaware 
 . Hiram R. Burton (R)

Florida 
 . Stephen M. Sparkman (D)
 . Frank Clark (D)
 . William B. Lamar (D)

Georgia 
 . Rufus E. Lester (D), until June 16, 1906
 James W. Overstreet (D), from October 3, 1906
 . James M. Griggs (D)
 . Elijah B. Lewis (D)
 . William C. Adamson (D)
 . Leonidas F. Livingston (D)
 . Charles L. Bartlett (D)
 . Gordon Lee (D)
 . William M. Howard (D)
 . Thomas Montgomery Bell (D)
 . Thomas W. Hardwick (D)
 . William G. Brantley (D)

Idaho 
 . Burton L. French (R)

Illinois 
 . Martin B. Madden (R)
 . James R. Mann (R)
 . William W. Wilson (R)
 . Charles S. Wharton (R)
 . Anthony Michalek (R)
 . William Lorimer (R)
 . Philip Knopf (R)
 . Charles McGavin (R)
 . Henry S. Boutell (R)
 . George E. Foss (R)
 . Howard M. Snapp (R)
 . Charles Eugene Fuller (R)
 . Robert R. Hitt (R), until September 20, 1906
 Frank O. Lowden (R), from November 6, 1906
 . Benjamin F. Marsh (R), until June 2, 1905
 James McKinney (R), from November 7, 1905
 . George W. Prince (R)
 . Joseph V. Graff (R)
 . John A. Sterling (R)
 . Joseph G. Cannon (R)
 . William B. McKinley (R)
 . Henry T. Rainey (D)
 . Zeno J. Rives (R)
 . William A. Rodenberg (R)
 . Frank S. Dickson (R)
 . Pleasant T. Chapman (R)
 . George Washington Smith (R)

Indiana 
 . John H. Foster (R), from May 16, 1905
 . John C. Chaney (R)
 . William T. Zenor (D)
 . Lincoln Dixon (D)
 . Elias S. Holliday (R)
 . James E. Watson (R)
 . Jesse Overstreet (R)
 . George W. Cromer (R)
 . Charles B. Landis (R)
 . Edgar D. Crumpacker (R)
 . Frederick Landis (R)
 . Newton W. Gilbert (R), until November 6, 1906
 Clarence C. Gilhams (R), from November 6, 1906
 . Abraham L. Brick (R)

Iowa 
 . Thomas Hedge (R)
 . Albert F. Dawson (R)
 . Benjamin P. Birdsall (R)
 . Gilbert N. Haugen (R)
 . Robert G. Cousins (R)
 . John F. Lacey (R)
 . John A. T. Hull (R)
 . William P. Hepburn (R)
 . Walter I. Smith (R)
 . James P. Conner (R)
 . Elbert H. Hubbard (R)

Kansas 
 . Charles Curtis (R), until January 28, 1907
 . Justin De Witt Bowersock (R)
 . Philip P. Campbell (R)
 . James Monroe Miller (R)
 . William A. Calderhead (R)
 . William A. Reeder (R)
 . Victor Murdock (R)
 . Charles Frederick Scott (R)

Kentucky 
 . Ollie M. James (D)
 . Augustus Stanley (D)
 . James M. Richardson (D)
 . David Highbaugh Smith (D)
 . J. Swagar Sherley (D)
 . Joseph L. Rhinock (D)
 . South Trimble (D)
 . George G. Gilbert (D)
 . Joseph B. Bennett (R)
 . Francis A. Hopkins (D)
 . Don C. Edwards (R)

Louisiana 
 . Adolph Meyer (D)
 . Robert C. Davey (D)
 . Robert F. Broussard (D)
 . John Thomas Watkins (D)
 . Joseph E. Ransdell (D)
 . Samuel M. Robertson (D)
 . Arsène Paulin Pujó (D)

Maine 
 . Amos L. Allen (R)
 . Charles E. Littlefield (R)
 . Edwin C. Burleigh (R)
 . Llewellyn Powers (R)

Maryland 
 . Thomas A. Smith (D)
 . J. Frederick C. Talbott (D)
 . Frank C. Wachter (R)
 . John Gill Jr. (D)
 . Sydney E. Mudd (R)
 . George A. Pearre (R)

Massachusetts 
 . George P. Lawrence (R)
 . Frederick H. Gillett (R)
 . Rockwood Hoar (R), until November 1, 1906
 Charles G. Washburn (R), from December 18, 1906
 . Charles Q. Tirrell (R)
 . Butler Ames (R)
 . Augustus P. Gardner (R)
 . Ernest W. Roberts (R)
 . Samuel W. McCall (R)
 . John A. Keliher (D)
 . William S. McNary (D)
 . John Andrew Sullivan (D)
 . John W. Weeks (R)
 . William S. Greene (R)
 . William C. Lovering (R)

Michigan 
 . Edwin C. Denby (R)
 . Charles E. Townsend (R)
 . Washington Gardner (R)
 . Edward L. Hamilton (R)
 . William Alden Smith (R), until February 9, 1907
 . Samuel W. Smith (R)
 . Henry McMorran (R)
 . Joseph W. Fordney (R)
 . Roswell P. Bishop (R)
 . George A. Loud (R)
 . Archibald B. Darragh (R)
 . H. Olin Young (R)

Minnesota 
 . James Albertus Tawney (R)
 . James T. McCleary (R)
 . Charles Russell Davis (R)
 . Frederick C. Stevens (R)
 . Loren Fletcher (R)
 . Clarence Buckman (R)
 . Andrew Volstead (R)
 . James Bede (R)
 . Halvor Steenerson (R)

Mississippi 
 . Ezekiel S. Candler Jr. (D)
 . Thomas Spight (D)
 . Benjamin G. Humphreys II (D)
 . Wilson S. Hill (D)
 . Adam M. Byrd (D)
 . Eaton J. Bowers (D)
 . Frank A. McLain (D)
 . John Sharp Williams (D)

Missouri 
 . James T. Lloyd (D)
 . William W. Rucker (D)
 . Frank B. Klepper (R)
 . Frank B. Fulkerson (R)
 . Edgar C. Ellis (R)
 . David A. De Armond (D)
 . John Welborn (R)
 . Dorsey W. Shackleford (D)
 . James Beauchamp Clark (D)
 . Richard Bartholdt (R)
 . John T. Hunt (D)
 . Ernest E. Wood (D), until June 23, 1906
 Harry M. Coudrey (R), from June 23, 1906
 . Marion E. Rhodes (R)
 . William T. Tyndall (R)
 . Cassius M. Shartel (R)
 . Arthur P. Murphy (R)

Montana 
 . Joseph M. Dixon (R)

Nebraska 
 . Elmer J. Burkett (R), until March 4, 1905
 Ernest M. Pollard (R), from July 18, 1905
 . John L. Kennedy (R)
 . John J. McCarthy (R)
 . Edmund H. Hinshaw (R)
 . George W. Norris (R)
 . Moses P. Kinkaid (R)

Nevada 
 . Clarence D. Van Duzer (D)

New Hampshire 
 . Cyrus A. Sulloway (R)
 . Frank Dunklee Currier (R)

New Jersey 
 . Henry C. Loudenslager (R)
 . John J. Gardner (R)
 . Benjamin F. Howell (R)
 . Ira W. Wood (R)
 . Charles N. Fowler (R)
 . Henry C. Allen (R)
 . Richard Wayne Parker (R)
 . William H. Wiley (R)
 . Marshall Van Winkle (R)
 . Allan L. McDermott (D)

New York 
 . William W. Cocks (R)
 . George H. Lindsay (D)
 . Charles T. Dunwell (R)
 . Charles B. Law (R)
 . George E. Waldo (R)
 . William M. Calder (R)
 . John J. Fitzgerald (D)
 . Timothy D. Sullivan (D), until July 27, 1906
 Daniel J. Riordan (D), from November 6, 1906
 . Henry M. Goldfogle (D)
 . William Sulzer (D)
 . William Randolph Hearst (D)
 . W. Bourke Cockran (D)
 . Herbert Parsons (R)
 . Charles A. Towne (D)
 . J. Van Vechten Olcott (R)
 . Jacob Ruppert (D)
 . William S. Bennet (R)
 . Joseph A. Goulden (D)
 . John E. Andrus (R)
 . Thomas W. Bradley (R)
 . John H. Ketcham (R), until November 4, 1906
 . William H. Draper (R)
 . George N. Southwick (R)
 . Frank J. LeFevre (R)
 . Lucius N. Littauer (R)
 . William H. Flack (R), until February 2, 1907
 . James S. Sherman (R)
 . Charles L. Knapp (R)
 . Michael E. Driscoll (R)
 . John W. Dwight (R)
 . Sereno E. Payne (R)
 . James B. Perkins (R)
 . J. Sloat Fassett (R)
 . James W. Wadsworth (R)
 . William H. Ryan (D)
 . De Alva S. Alexander (R)
 . Edward B. Vreeland (R)

North Carolina 
 . John Humphrey Small (D)
 . Claude Kitchin (D)
 . Charles R. Thomas (D)
 . Edward W. Pou (D)
 . William W. Kitchin (D)
 . Gilbert B. Patterson (D)
 . Robert N. Page (D)
 . E. Spencer Blackburn (R)
 . Edwin Y. Webb (D)
 . James M. Gudger Jr. (D)

North Dakota 
 . Thomas Frank Marshall (R)
 . Asle Gronna (R)

Ohio 
 . Nicholas Longworth (R)
 . Herman P. Goebel (R)
 . Robert M. Nevin (R)
 . Harvey C. Garber (D)
 . William Wildman Campbell (R)
 . Thomas E. Scroggy (R)
 . J. Warren Keifer (R)
 . Ralph D. Cole (R)
 . James H. Southard (R)
 . Henry T. Bannon (R)
 . Charles H. Grosvenor (R)
 . Edward L. Taylor Jr. (R)
 . Grant E. Mouser (R)
 . Amos R. Webber (R)
 . Beman G. Dawes (R)
 . Capell L. Weems (R)
 . Martin L. Smyser (R)
 . James Kennedy (R)
 . W. Aubrey Thomas (R)
 . Jacob A. Beidler (R)
 . Theodore E. Burton (R)

Oregon 
 . Binger Hermann (R)
 . John N. Williamson (R)

Pennsylvania 
 . Henry H. Bingham (R)
 . Robert Adams Jr. (R), until June 1, 1906
 John E. Reyburn (R), from November 6, 1906
 . George A. Castor (R), until February 19, 1906
 J. Hampton Moore (R), from November 6, 1906
 . Reuben O. Moon (R)
 . Edward D. Morrell (R)
 . George D. McCreary (R)
 . Thomas S. Butler (R)
 . Irving P. Wanger (R)
 . Henry B. Cassel (R)
 . Thomas H. Dale (R)
 . Henry W. Palmer (R)
 . George R. Patterson (R), until March 21, 1906
 Charles N. Brumm (R), from November 6, 1906
 . Marcus C. L. Kline (D)
 . Mial E. Lilley (R)
 . Elias Deemer (R)
 . Edmund W. Samuel (R)
 . Thaddeus M. Mahon (R)
 . Marlin E. Olmsted (R)
 . John M. Reynolds (R)
 . Daniel F. Lafean (R)
 . Solomon R. Dresser (R)
 . George F. Huff (R)
 . Allen F. Cooper (R)
 . Ernest F. Acheson (R)
 . Arthur L. Bates (R)
 . Gustav A. Schneebeli (R)
 . William O. Smith (R)
 . Joseph C. Sibley (R)
 . William H. Graham (R)
 . John Dalzell (R)
 . James F. Burke (R)
 . Andrew J. Barchfeld (R)

Rhode Island 
 . Daniel L. D. Granger (D)
 . Adin B. Capron (R)

South Carolina 
 . George S. Legare (D)
 . James O. Patterson (D)
 . Wyatt Aiken (D)
 . Joseph T. Johnson (D)
 . David E. Finley (D)
 . J. Edwin Ellerbe (D)
 . Asbury F. Lever (D)

South Dakota 
 . Charles H. Burke (R)
 . Eben W. Martin (R)

Tennessee 
 . Walter P. Brownlow (R)
 . Nathan W. Hale (R)
 . John A. Moon (D)
 . Mounce G. Butler (D)
 . William C. Houston (D)
 . John W. Gaines (D)
 . Lemuel P. Padgett (D)
 . Thetus W. Sims (D)
 . Finis J. Garrett (D)
 . Malcolm R. Patterson (D), until November 5, 1906

Texas 
 . Morris Sheppard (D)
 . Moses L. Broocks (D)
 . Gordon J. Russell (D)
 . Choice B. Randell (D)
 . James Andrew Beall (D)
 . Scott Field (D)
 . Alexander W. Gregg (D)
 . John M. Pinckney (D), until April 24, 1905
 John M. Moore (D), from June 6, 1905
 . George Farmer Burgess (D)
 . Albert S. Burleson (D)
 . Robert L. Henry (D)
 . Oscar W. Gillespie (D)
 . John H. Stephens (D)
 . James L. Slayden (D)
 . John Nance Garner (D)
 . William R. Smith (D)

Utah 
 . Joseph Howell (R)

Vermont 
 . David J. Foster (R)
 . Kittredge Haskins (R)

Virginia 
 . William A. Jones (D)
 . Harry L. Maynard (D)
 . John Lamb (D)
 . Robert G. Southall (D)
 . Claude A. Swanson (D), until January 30, 1906
 Edward W. Saunders (D), from November 6, 1906
 . Carter Glass (D)
 . James Hay (D)
 . John F. Rixey (D), until February 8, 1907
 . Campbell Slemp (R)
 . Henry D. Flood (D)

Washington 
 . Wesley L. Jones (R)
 . Francis W. Cushman (R)
 . William E. Humphrey (R)

West Virginia 
 . Blackburn B. Dovener (R)
 . Alston G. Dayton (R), until March 16, 1905
 Thomas B. Davis (D), from June 6, 1905
 . Joseph Holt Gaines (R)
 . Harry C. Woodyard (R)
 . James Anthony Hughes (R)

Wisconsin 
 . Henry Allen Cooper (R)
 . Henry C. Adams (R), until July 9, 1906
 John M. Nelson (R), from September 4, 1906
 . Joseph W. Babcock (R)
 . Theobald Otjen (R)
 . William H. Stafford (R)
 . Charles H. Weisse (D)
 . John J. Esch (R)
 . James H. Davidson (R)
 . Edward S. Minor (R)
 . Webster E. Brown (R)
 . John J. Jenkins (R)

Wyoming 
 . Franklin W. Mondell (R)

Non-voting members 
 . Frank Hinman Waskey (D), from August 14, 1906
 . Marcus Aurelius Smith (D)
 . Jonah Kunio Kalanianaole (R)
 . William Henry Andrews (R)
 . Bird Segle McGuire (R)
 . Tulio Larrínaga (Resident Commissioner), (Unionist)

Changes in membership
The count below reflects changes from the beginning of the first session of this Congress.

Senate
 Replacements: 8
 Democratic: no net change
 Republican: no net change
 Deaths: 5
 Resignations: 1
 Vacancies: 2
 Total seats with changes:  9

House of Representatives
 Replacements: 17
 Democratic: no net change
 Republican: no net change
 Deaths: 12
 Resignations: 11
 Contested elections: 1
 New seats: 1
 Total seats with changes: 26

Committees

Senate

 Additional Accommodations for the Library of Congress (Select) (Chairman: Thomas S. Martin)
 Agriculture and Forestry (Chairman: Redfield Proctor; Ranking Member: Chester I. Long)
 Appropriations (Chairman: William B. Allison; Ranking Member: Henry M. Teller)
 Audit and Control the Contingent Expenses of the Senate (Chairman: John Kean; Ranking Member: Hernando D. Money)
 Canadian Relations (Chairman: Winthrop Murray Crane; Ranking Member: Benjamin R. Tillman)
 Census (Chairman: Chester I. Long; Ranking Member: Samuel D. McEnery)
 Civil Service and Retrenchment (Chairman: George C. Perkins; Ranking Member: Fred T. Dubois)
 Claims (Chairman: Charles W. Fulton; Ranking Member: Thomas S. Martin)
 Coast and Insular Survey (Chairman: Samuel H. Piles; Ranking Member: John T. Morgan)
 Coast Defenses (Chairman: Philander C. Knox; Ranking Member: Charles A. Culberson)
 Commerce (Chairman: William P. Frye; Ranking Member: James H. Berry)
 Corporations Organized in the District of Columbia (Chairman: Samuel D. McEnery; Ranking Member: Nelson W. Aldrich)
 Cuban Relations (Chairman: Henry E. Burnham; Ranking Member: Henry M. Teller)
 Distributing Public Revenue Among the States (Select)
 District of Columbia (Chairman: Jacob H. Gallinger; Ranking Member: Thomas S. Martin)
 Education and Labor (Chairman: Jonathan P. Dolliver; Ranking Member: John W. Daniel)
 Engrossed Bills (Chairman: James H. Berry; Ranking Member: Alfred B. Kittredge)
 Enrolled Bills (Chairman: John F. Dryden; Ranking Member: Murphy J. Foster Jr.)
 Establish a University in the United States (Select) (Chairman: James A. Hemenway; Ranking Member: Charles A. Culberson)
 Examination of Disposition of Documents (Select) (Chairman: Edmund W. Pettus)
 Examine the Several Branches in the Civil Service (Chairman: Morgan G. Bulkeley; Ranking Member: Charles A. Culberson)
 Expenditures in Executive Departments
 Finance (Chairman: Nelson W. Aldrich; Ranking Member: John W. Daniel)
 Fisheries (Chairman: Albert J. Hopkins; Ranking Member: Stephen R. Mallory)
 Five Civilized Tribes of Indians (Select) (Chairman: Benjamin R. Tillman; Ranking Member: John T. Morgan)
 Foreign Relations (Chairman: Shelby M. Cullom; Ranking Member: John T. Morgan)
 Forest Reservations and the Protection of Game (Chairman: Frank B. Brandegee; Ranking Member: John T. Morgan)
 Geological Survey (Chairman: Frank P. Flint; Ranking Member: Hernando D. Money)
 Immigration (Chairman: William P. Dillingham; Ranking Member: Anselm J. McLaurin)
 Indian Affairs (Chairman: Moses E. Clapp; Ranking Member: John T. Morgan)
 Indian Depredations (Chairman: Elmer J. Burkett; Ranking Member: Augustus O. Bacon)
 Industrial Expositions (Chairman: William Warner; Ranking Member: John W. Daniel)
 Investigate the Condition of the Potomac River Front at Washington (Select) (Chairman: Joseph H. Millard; Ranking Member: Thomas S. Martin)
 Indian Territory (Select) 
 Interoceanic Canals (Chairman: Joseph H. Millard; Ranking Member: John T. Morgan)
 Interstate Commerce (Chairman: Stephen B. Elkins; Ranking Member: Benjamin R. Tillman)  
 Irrigation and Reclamation of Arid Lands (Chairman: Levi Ankeny; Ranking Member: Clarence D. Van Duzer)
 Judiciary (Chairman: Clarence D. Clark; Ranking Member: Joseph W. Bailey) 
 Library (Chairman: George P. Wetmore; Ranking Member: William A. Clark)
 Manufactures (Chairman: Weldon B. Heyburn; Ranking Member: Alexander S. Clay)
 Military Affairs (Chairman: Francis E. Warren; Ranking Member: Edmund W. Pettus)
 Mines and Mining (Chairman: Charles Dick; Ranking Member: Benjamin R. Tillman)
 Mississippi River and its Tributaries (Select) (Chairman: Knute Nelson)
 National Banks (Select) (Chairman: George S. Nixon; Ranking Member: Samuel D. McEnery)
 Naval Affairs (Chairman: Eugene Hale; Ranking Member: Benjamin R. Tillman)
 Organization, Conduct and Expenditures of the Executive Departments (Chairman: Thomas H. Carter; Ranking Member: Anselm J. McLaurin) 
 Pacific Islands and Puerto Rico (Chairman: Joseph B. Foraker; Ranking Member: Stephen R. Mallory)
 Pacific Railroads (Chairman: Russell A. Alger; Ranking Member: John T. Morgan)
 Patents (Chairman: Alfred B. Kittredge; Ranking Member: Stephen R. Mallory)
 Pensions (Chairman: Porter J. McCumber; Ranking Member: James P. Taliaferro)
 Philippines (Chairman: Henry Cabot Lodge; Ranking Member: Charles A. Culberson)
 Post Office and Post Roads (Chairman: Boies Penrose; Ranking Member: Arthur P. Gorman)
 Potomac River Front (Select)
 Printing (Chairman: Thomas C. Platt; Ranking Member: Arthur P. Gorman)
 Private Land Claims (Chairman: Henry M. Teller; Ranking Member: Eugene Hale)
 Privileges and Elections (Chairman: Julius C. Burrows; Ranking Member: Edmund W. Pettus)
 Public Buildings and Grounds (Chairman: Nathan B. Scott; Ranking Member: Charles A. Culberson)
 Public Health and National Quarantine (Chairman: John Tyler Morgan; Ranking Member: John Coit Spooner)
 Public Lands (Chairman: Henry C. Hansbrough; Ranking Member: James H. Berry)
 Railroads (Chairman: J. Frank Allee; Ranking Member: Augustus O. Bacon)
 Revision of the Laws (Chairman: Chauncey M. Depew; Ranking Member: John W. Daniel)
 Revolutionary Claims (Chairman: Alexander S. Clay; Ranking Member: Russell A. Alger)
 Rules (Chairman: John C. Spooner; Ranking Member: Henry M. Teller)
 Standards, Weights and Measures (Select) (Chairman: Reed Smoot; Ranking Member: William A. Clark)
 Tariff Regulation (Select)
 Territories (Chairman: Albert J. Beveridge; Ranking Member: Thomas M. Patterson)
 Transportation and Sale of Meat Products (Select) (Chairman: John W. Daniel; Ranking Member: Clarence D. Clark)
 Transportation Routes to the Seaboard (Chairman: Robert J. Gamble; Ranking Member: Edmund W. Pettus)
 Trespassers upon Indian Lands (Select) (Chairman: George Sutherland)
 Ventilation and Acoustics (Select) (Chairman: Roswell P. Bishop; Ranking Member: David H. Smith)
 Whole
 Woman Suffrage (Select) (Chairman: Augustus O. Bacon; Ranking Member: George P. Wetmore)

House of Representatives

 Accounts (Chairman: H. Burd Cassel; Ranking Member: Charles Lafayette Bartlett)
 Agriculture (Chairman: James W. Wadsworth; Ranking Member: John Lamb)
 Alcoholic Liquor Traffic (Chairman: Nehemiah D. Sperry; Ranking Member: John L. Burnett)
 Appropriations (Chairman: James A. Tawney; Ranking Member: Leonidas F. Livingston)
 Banking and Currency (Chairman: Charles N. Fowler; Ranking Member: Elijah B. Lewis)  
 Census (Chairman: Edgar D. Crumpacker; Ranking Member: James Hay)
 Claims (Chairman: James M. Miller; Ranking Member: Henry M. Goldfogle)
 Coinage, Weights and Measures (Chairman: James H. Southard; Ranking Member: John W. Gaines)
 Disposition of Executive Papers
 District of Columbia (Chairman: Joseph W. Babcock; Ranking Member: Thetus W. Sims)
 Education (Chairman: George N. Southwick; Ranking Member: Edwin Y. Webb)
 Election of the President, Vice President and Representatives in Congress (Chairman: Joseph H. Gaines; Ranking Member: William W. Rucker)
 Elections No.#1 (Chairman: James Robert Mann; Ranking Member: Ollie M. James)
 Elections No.#2 (Chairman: Marlin E. Olmsted; Ranking Member: Joshua Frederick Cockey Talbott)
 Elections No.#3 (Chairman: Michael E. Driscoll; Ranking Member: Choice B. Randell)
 Enrolled Bills (Chairman: Frank C. Wachter; Ranking Member: James T. Lloyd)
 Expenditures in the Agriculture Department (Chairman: Charles E. Littlefield; Ranking Member: Henry D. Flood)
 Expenditures in the Commerce and Labor Departments (Chairman: David J. Foster; Ranking Member: Arsene P. Pujo)
 Expenditures in the Interior Department (Chairman: Edward S. Minor; Ranking Member: Robert N. Page)
 Expenditures in the Justice Department (Chairman: William A. Calderhead; Ranking Member: Robert N. Page)
 Expenditures in the Navy Department (Chairman: Joseph W. Fordney; Ranking Member: Choice B. Randell)
 Expenditures in the Post Office Department (Chairman: Irving P. Wanger; Ranking Member: Carter Glass)
 Expenditures in the State Department (Chairman: John H. Ketcham; Ranking Member: Rufus E. Lester)
 Expenditures in the Treasury Department (Chairman: Robert G. Cousins; Ranking Member: John Lamb)
 Expenditures in the War Department (Chairman: George P. Lawrence; Ranking Member: George F. Burgess)
 Expenditures on Public Buildings (Chairman: James A. Hughes; Ranking Member: John H. Small)
 Foreign Affairs (Chairman: Robert R. Hitt; Ranking Member: William M. Howard)
 Immigration and Naturalization (Chairman: Benjamin F. Howell; Ranking Member: Jacob Ruppert Jr.)
 Indian Affairs (Chairman: James S. Sherman; Ranking Member: John H. Stephens)
 Industrial Arts and Expositions (Chairman: Augustus P. Gardner; Ranking Member: Charles L. Bartlett)
 Insular Affairs (Chairman: Henry Allen Cooper; Ranking Member: William A. Jones)
 Interstate and Foreign Commerce (Chairman: William P. Hepburn; Ranking Member: Robert C. Davey)
 Invalid Pensions (Chairman: Cyrus A. Sulloway; Ranking Member: George H. Lindsay)
 Irrigation of Arid Lands (Chairman: Frank W. Mondell; Ranking Member: Clarence D. Van Duzer)
 Judiciary (Chairman: John J. Jenkins; Ranking Member: David A. De Armond) 
 Labor (Chairman: John J. Gardner; Ranking Member: William Randolph Hearst)
 Levees and Improvements of the Mississippi River (Chairman: George W. Prince; Ranking Member: Robert F. Broussard)
 Library (Chairman: James T. McCleary; Ranking Member: William M. Howard)
 Manufactures (Chairman: Joseph C. Sibley; Ranking Member: Charles H. Weisse)
 Merchant Marine and Fisheries (Chairman: Charles H. Grosvenor; Ranking Member: Thomas Spight)
 Mileage (Chairman: William A. Reeder; Ranking Member: Elijah B. Lewis)
 Military Affairs (Chairman: John A.T. Hull; Ranking Member: William Sulzer)
 Militia (Chairman: Edward De V. Morrell; Ranking Member: Augustus O. Stanley)
 Mines and Mining (Chairman: Webster E. Brown; Ranking Member: Adolph Meyer)
 Naval Affairs (Chairman: George E. Foss; Ranking Member: Adolph Meyer)
 Pacific Railroads (Chairman: Thomas S. Butler; Ranking Member: James L. Slayden)
 Patents (Chairman: Frank D. Currier; Ranking Member: William Sulzer)
 Pensions (Chairman: Henry C. Loudenslager; Ranking Member: William Richardson)
 Post Office and Post Roads (Chairman: Jesse Overstreet; Ranking Member: John A. Moon)
 Printing (Chairman: Charles B. Landis; Ranking Member: James M. Griggs)
 Private Land Claims (Chairman: George W. Smith; Ranking Member: William A. Jones)
 Public Buildings and Grounds (Chairman: Richard Bartholdt; Ranking Member: John H. Bankhead)
 Public Lands (Chairman: John F. Lacey; Ranking Member: John L. Burnett)
 Railways and Canals (Chairman: James H. Davidson; Ranking Member: John L. Burnett)
 Reform in the Civil Service (Chairman: Frederick H. Gillett; Ranking Member: Edward W. Pou)
 Revision of Laws (Chairman: Reuben O. Moon; Ranking Member: Robert B. Macon)
 Rivers and Harbors (Chairman: Theodore E. Burton; Ranking Member: Rufus E. Lester)
 Rules (Chairman: John Dalzell; Ranking Member: John S. Williams) 
 Standards of Official Conduct
 Territories (Chairman: Edward L. Hamilton; Ranking Member: John A. Moon)
 Ventilation and Acoustics (Chairman: Roswell P. Bishop; Ranking Member: David H. Smith)
 War Claims (Chairman: Thaddeus M. Mahon; Ranking Member: Thetus W. Sims)
 Ways and Means (Chairman: Sereno E. Payne; Ranking Member: John S. Williams)
 Whole

Joint committees

 Conditions of Indian Tribes (Special)
 Disposition of (Useless) Executive Papers (Chairman: Rep. Arthur L. Bates; Vice Chairman: Sen. )
 Revision of the Laws
 The Library
 Printing
 Second Class Mail Matter

Caucuses
 Democratic (House)
 Democratic (Senate)

Employees

Legislative branch agency directors
Architect of the Capitol: Elliott Woods
Librarian of Congress: Herbert Putnam 
Public Printer of the United States: Francis W. Palmer, until 1905 
 Charles A. Stillings, from 1905

Senate
Secretary: Charles G. Bennett
Librarian: Edward C. Goodwin
Sergeant at Arms: Daniel M. Ransdell
Chaplain: The Rev. Edward E. Hale, Unitarian

House of Representatives
Clerk: Alexander McDowell
Sergeant at Arms: Henry Casson
Doorkeeper: Frank B. Lyon
Postmaster: Joseph C. McElroy
Clerk at the Speaker's Table: Asher C. Hinds
Reading Clerks: E.L. Sampson (D) and Dennis E. Alward (R)
Chaplain: The Rev. Henry N. Couden, Universalist

See also 
 1904 United States elections (elections leading to this Congress)
 1904 United States presidential election
 1904–05 United States Senate elections
 1904 United States House of Representatives elections
 1906 United States elections (elections during this Congress, leading to the next Congress)
 1906–07 United States Senate elections
 1906 United States House of Representatives elections

References